Mollin is a surname. Notable people with the surname include:

 Bart Mollin (born 1981), Belgian alpine skier, competitor in the 2010 Winter Olympics
 Englebert Mollin known as Bart Mollin (1904–1945), Belgian wrestler, competitor in the 1924 Summer Olympics
 Fred Mollin, American record producer and composer
 Gabriel Mollin (1835–1912) French revolutionary
 Henri Mollin (1867–1958), French Army captain involved in the 1904 Affair of the Cards
 Henri Mollin (born 1958), Belgian alpine skier, competitor in the 1980 Winter Olympics and 1984 Winter Olympics
 Lucie Maria Mollin (1894–1971), wife of German General Erwin Rommel
 Maurice Mollin (1924–2003), Belgian racing cylist
 Piet Mollin (born 1901), Belgian wrestler, competitor in the 1928 Summer Olympics